Navy Captain (retired) Joseph Adeduro Adeusi was governor of Akwa Ibom State, Nigeria from August 1996 to August 1998 during the military regime of General Sani Abacha.

As administrator, Adeusi founded the Akwa United Football Club, which played their inaugural match against the Rangers International F.C of Enugu in December 1996.
He initiated a probe into the government of Uyo Local Government Area, which was headed by John James Akpanudoedehe, who later became Senator. 
In January 1998 he had to deal with protests over an oil spill from a Mobil pipeline. He spent over nine hours negotiating with several thousand demonstrators, eventually agreeing to establish a claims office in Eket. Over 300 of the demonstrators were later detained.

Navy Captain John Adeusi died on April 16, 2016 at the age of 76.

References 

Nigerian military governors of Akwa Ibom State
2016 deaths
1940 births